A gubernatorial election was held on 7 April 2019 to elect the next governor of Mie.

Candidates 
Eikei Suzuki* back by CDP, LDP, DPFP, SDP.
Kanako Suzuki, back by the JCP.

Results

References 

Gubernatorial elections in Japan
2019 elections in Japan
April 2019 events in Japan
Politics of Mie Prefecture